Heterocrossa is a genus of moths in the Carposinidae family. It is endemic to New Zealand. This genus was previously regarded as a synonym of the genus Carposina. However Elwood C. Zimmerman in Insects of Hawaii (1978, p. 797) removed Heterocrossa from synonymy with Carposina. Zimmerman argued that as the genitalia of Heterocrossa and Carposina are distinct, Heterocrossa should not be regarded as a synonym of Carposina. This was agreed with by John S. Dugdale in his annotated catalogue of New Zealand lepidoptera.

Species
Species contained in the genus include:

Heterocrossa adreptella (Walker, 1864)
Heterocrossa canescens (Philpott, 1930)
Heterocrossa charaxias Meyrick, 1891 
Heterocrossa contactella (Walker, 1866)
Heterocrossa cryodana Meyrick, 1885
Heterocrossa epomiana Meyrick, 1885
Heterocrossa eriphylla Meyrick, 1888
Heterocrossa exochana Meyrick, 1888
Heterocrossa gonosemana Meyrick, 1882
Heterocrossa hudsoni Dugdale, 1988
Heterocrossa ignobilis (Philpott, 1930)
Heterocrossa iophaea Meyrick, 1907
Heterocrossa literata (Philpott, 1930)
Heterocrossa maculosa (Philpott, 1927)
Heterocrossa morbida (Meyrick, 1912)
Heterocrossa philpotti Dugdale, 1971
Heterocrossa rubophaga Dugdale, 1988
Heterocrossa sanctimonea (Clarke, 1926)
Heterocrossa sarcanthes (Meyrick, 1918)

References

Carposinidae
Endemic fauna of New Zealand
Taxa named by Edward Meyrick
Endemic moths of New Zealand